The Oman Children's Museum is a children's science museum, located near Qurum Nature Park off Sultan Qaboos Street in a white-domed building in Muscat, Oman.

The museum was established by the Ministry of National Heritage and Culture and opened on November 17, 1990, by Sultan Qaboos bin Said al Said on the 20th National Day celebration in Oman. The museum has 45 exhibits and two demonstrations and comprises . It was the first science museum in Oman and is visited by around 50,000 visitors annually. The museum is currently run by a former school teacher, Samirah Ahmed al Raisi, who has run the museum for over six years.

The museum addresses the scientific ways of human life and the exhibition section is divided into three parts; The Human life, Physics and observation which investigates the progression of science through the ages.

The museum has many hands-on displays. These include experiences of a fake electric shock, trigger a lightning bolt, launching a hot air balloon, photographing your own shadow, and sending message through a whisper dish.

References

1990 establishments in Oman
Museums established in 1990
Museums in Muscat, Oman
Children's museums
Science museums
Children's Museum
Child-related organizations in Oman